

Cucumis is a genus of twining, tendril-bearing plants in the family Cucurbitaceae which includes the cucumber (Cucumis sativus), muskmelons (Cucumis melo, including cantaloupe and  honeydew), the horned melon (Cucumis metuliferus), and the West Indian gherkin (Cucumis anguria).

30 species occur in Africa, and 25 occur in India, Southeast Asia, and Australia. However, Cucumis myriocarpus was introduced to Australia from Sub-Saharan Africa, and is regarded as an invasive species.

Species
, Plants of the World Online accepted 61 species:

Cucumis aculeatus Cogn.
Cucumis aetheocarpus (C.Jeffrey) Ghebret. & Thulin
Cucumis africanus L.f.
Cucumis althaeoides (Ser.) P.Sebastian & I.Telford
Cucumis anguria L.
Cucumis argenteus (Domin) P.Sebastian & I.Telford
Cucumis asper Cogn.
Cucumis baladensis Thulin
Cucumis bryoniifolius (Merxm.) Ghebret. & Thulin
Cucumis canoxyi Thulin & Al-Gifri
Cucumis carolinus J.H.Kirkbr.
Cucumis cinereus (Cogn.) Ghebret. & Thulin
Cucumis clavipetiolatus (J.H.Kirkbr.) Ghebret. & Thulin
Cucumis costatus I.Telford
Cucumis debilis W.J.de Wilde & Duyfjes
Cucumis dipsaceus Ehrenb. ex Spach
Cucumis engleri (Gilg) Ghebret. & Thulin
Cucumis ficifolius A.Rich.
Cucumis globosus C.Jeffrey
Cucumis gracilis (Kurz) Ghebret. & Thulin
Cucumis hastatus Thulin
Cucumis heptadactylus Naudin
Cucumis hirsutus Sond.
Cucumis humifructus Stent (as Cucumis humofructus)
Cucumis hystrix Chakrav.
Cucumis indicus Ghebret. & Thulin
Cucumis insignis C.Jeffrey
Cucumis javanicus (Miq.) Ghebret. & Thulin
Cucumis jeffreyanus Thulin
Cucumis kalahariensis A.Meeuse
Cucumis kelleri (Cogn.) Ghebret. & Thulin
Cucumis kirkbridei Ghebret. & Thulin
Cucumis leiospermus (Wight & Arn.) Ghebret. & Thulin
Cucumis maderaspatanus L.
Cucumis meeusei C.Jeffrey
Cucumis melo L.
Cucumis messorius (C.Jeffrey) Ghebret. & Thulin
Cucumis metuliferus E.Mey. ex Naudin
Cucumis myriocarpus Naudin
Cucumis omissus Thulin
Cucumis picrocarpus F.Muell.
Cucumis prophetarum L.
Cucumis pubituberculatus Thulin
Cucumis pustulatus Naudin ex Hook.f.
Cucumis queenslandicus I.Telford
Cucumis quintanilhae R.Fern. & A.Fern.
Cucumis reticulatus (A.Fern. & R.Fern.) Ghebret. & Thulin
Cucumis rigidus E.Mey. ex Sond.
Cucumis ritchiei (C.B.Clarke) Ghebret. & Thulin
Cucumis rostratus J.H.Kirkbr.
Cucumis rumphianus (Scheff.) H.Schaef.
Cucumis sacleuxii Paill. & Bois
Cucumis sagittatus Wawra & Peyr.
Cucumis sativus L., cucumber
Cucumis setosus Cogn.
Cucumis silentvalleyi (Manilal, T.Sabu & P.Mathew) Ghebret. & Thulin
Cucumis thulinianus J.H.Kirkbr.
Cucumis umbellatus I.Telford
Cucumis variabilis P.Sebastian & I.Telford
Cucumis zambianus Widrl., J.H.Kirkbr., Ghebret. & K.R.Reitsma
Cucumis zeyheri Sond.

See also

 Bailan melon
 Galia melon
 Gaya melon
 Hami melon
 Korean melon
 Santa Claus melon
 Sugar melon
 Winter melon

References

Further reading
 Ghebretinsae, A. G., Thulin, M. & Barber, J. C. (2007). Relationships of cucumbers and melons unraveled: molecular phylogenetics of Cucumis and related genera (Benincaseae, Cucurbitaceae). American Journal of Botany 94(7): 1256–1266.
 
 Sebastian, P. M., H. Schaefer, I. R. H. Telford, and S. S. Renner. 2010. Cucumber and melon have their wild progenitors in India, and the sister species of Cucumis melo is from Australia" Proceedings of the National Academy of Sciences 107(32)  14269–14273 (online)
 Telford, I. R. H., P. M. Sebastian, J. J. Bruhl, and S. S. Renner. 2011. Cucumis (Cucurbitaceae) in Australia and eastern Malesia, including newly recognized species and the sister species to C. melo. Systematic Botany 36(2): 376-389 (online)

External links 
 Multilingual taxonomic information at the University of Melbourne

 
Cucurbitaceae genera